In Greek mythology, Eleusis or Eleusinus (or ) was the eponymous hero of the town of Eleusis.

Family 
Eleusis was a son of Hermes and the Oceanid Daeira, or of Ogygus. Panyassis wrote of him as father of Triptolemus, adding that "Demeter came to him"; this version of the myth is found in the works of Hyginus and Servius. In other accounts, Eleusis had no offspring.

Mythology 
King Eleusis and Cothonea (Cyntinia), parents of Triptolemus, are visited by Demeter, who rears their son, feeding him divine milk by day and placing him into the fire at night, which makes Triptolemus grow faster than mortal children normally do. She eventually kills Eleusis for intervening when the fire ritual is performed. The myth is closely parallel with the one that deals with Demeter visiting Celeus and Metaneira (also possible parents of Triptolemus) and nursing their son Demophon.

In other accounts, Eleusis appears as a female character.

See also
List of Greek mythological figures

Notes

References 

 Apollodorus, The Library with an English Translation by Sir James George Frazer, F.B.A., F.R.S. in 2 Volumes, Cambridge, MA, Harvard University Press; London, William Heinemann Ltd. 1921. . Online version at the Perseus Digital Library. Greek text available from the same website.
Gaius Julius Hyginus, Fabulae from The Myths of Hyginus translated and edited by Mary Grant. University of Kansas Publications in Humanistic Studies. Online version at the Topos Text Project.
The Homeric Hymns and Homerica with an English Translation by Hugh G. Evelyn-White. Homeric Hymns. Cambridge, MA.,Harvard University Press; London, William Heinemann Ltd. 1914. Online version at the Perseus Digital Library. Greek text available from the same website.
 Pausanias, Description of Greece with an English Translation by W.H.S. Jones, Litt.D., and H.A. Ormerod, M.A., in 4 Volumes. Cambridge, MA, Harvard University Press; London, William Heinemann Ltd. 1918. . Online version at the Perseus Digital Library
 Pausanias, Graeciae Descriptio. 3 vols. Leipzig, Teubner. 1903.  Greek text available at the Perseus Digital Library.

Children of Hermes
Demigods in classical mythology
Eleusinian characters in Greek mythology
Eleusinian mythology